The hypobromite ion, also called alkaline bromine water, is BrO−. Bromine is in the +1 oxidation state. The Br–O bond length is 1.82 Å. Hypobromite is the bromine compound analogous to hypochlorites found in common bleaches, and in immune cells. In many ways, hypobromite functions in the same manner as hypochlorite, and is also used as a germicide and antiparasitic in both industrial applications, and in the immune system.

Preparation
Hypobromite salts form upon treating bromine with aqueous alkali, such as sodium or potassium hydroxide. At 20 °C the reaction is rapid.

 Br2 + 2 OH−(aq) → Br− + BrO− + H2O

In this reaction the bromine disproportionates (some undergoes reduction and some oxidation) from oxidation state 0 (Br2) to oxidation state −1 (Br−) and oxidation state +1 (BrO−). Sodium hypobromite can be isolated as an orange solid.

A secondary reaction, where hypobromite spontaneously disproportionates to bromide (bromine oxidation state −1) and bromate (bromine oxidation state +5)  takes place rapidly at 20 °C and slowly at 0 °C.

 3 BrO− →  2 Br− + 

Hence, in reaction 2, the formation and proportions of the −1, +1 and +5 bromine oxidation state products can be controlled by temperature. Hypobromite is not thermodynamically stable at any pH (see Pourbaix diagram for bromine at http://www.eosremediation.com/download/Chemistry/Chemical%20Properties/Eh_pH_Diagrams.pdf ), but it is kinetically locked toward a further disproportion into bromate and bromide above the pKa of HBrO. 

These reactions of bromine are analogous to those of chlorine forming hypochlorite and chlorate. The corresponding chlorine reaction 1 (to form ClO−) is fast at 20 °C and reaction 2 (to form ) is slow at 20 °C and fast at 70 °C.

Compounds
A hypobromite is a compound that contains this anion. Examples include sodium hypobromite and potassium hypobromite.

In nature and industry 
Bromide from the diet, naturally present in the blood, is used by eosinophils, white blood cells of the granulocyte class, specialized for dealing with multi-cellular parasites. These cells react the bromide with peroxide to generate hypobromite by the action of eosinophil peroxidase, a haloperoxidase enzyme which preferentially uses bromide over chloride for this purpose.

Simple bromide salts (such as sodium bromide) are also sometimes used in hot tubs and spas as mild germicidal agents, using the action of an added oxidizing agent (such as hydrogen peroxide) to generate in situ hypobromite, in a similar fashion to the action of peroxidase on bromide in eosinophils.

Hypobromite has been proposed to be a reactive intermediate in the Hofmann rearrangement.

See also 
Other bromine anions:

References

Hypobromites